HC Nové Zámky is a professional ice hockey team playing in the Slovak Extraliga, the top level of ice hockey in the country. They play in the city of Nové Zámky, Slovakia at Nové Zámky Ice Stadium. The team is nicknamed Býci, meaning "Bulls" in English.

History
The club was founded in 1965. In the 2013–14 season won first time title in MOL Liga. Next season 2014–15 they lost in final with DVTK Jegesmedvék, 0–4 in series. In the same season, team won lowest league in Slovakia Slovak 2. Liga and qualify to Slovak 1. Liga. In first season of the second level of ice hockey in the country, they won a title 2015–16 season.

Honours

Domestic

Slovak 1. Liga
  Winners (1): 2015–16

Slovak 2. Liga
  Winners (1): 2014–15
  Runners-up (1): 2004–05

International

Erste Liga

  Winners (1): 2013–14 
  Runners-up (1): 2014–15

Players

Current roster

References

External links
 Official website

Sport in Nitra Region
Nové Zámky
1965 establishments in Slovakia